Bernard John Seymour Coleridge, 2nd Baron Coleridge (19 August 1851 – 4 September 1927) was a British lawyer, judge, and Liberal politician who sat in the House of Commons from 1885 until 1894 when he inherited his peerage.

Biography
Coleridge was the eldest son of John Coleridge, 1st Baron Coleridge, Lord Chief Justice of England, and Jane Fortescue Seymour. His grandfather, John Taylor Coleridge, was the nephew of the poet Samuel Taylor Coleridge. He was educated at Eton and Trinity College, Oxford. He was called to the bar at Middle Temple in 1877.

Coleridge was elected Member of Parliament for Sheffield Attercliffe in the 1885 general election and held the seat until 1894 when he succeeded his father as second Baron Coleridge. He was the first peer to regularly practice at the bar.

Coleridge became a QC in 1892 and served as a Judge of the High Court of Justice from 1907 to 1923.

Lord Coleridge married Mary Alethea Mackarness, daughter of John Fielder Mackarness (Bishop of Oxford), on 3 August 1876. They had three children, one son and two daughters. He died in September 1927, in Honiton, Devon, aged 76, and was succeeded in the barony by his only son Geoffrey.

Selected bibliography
The Story of a Devonshire House (1905)
This for Remembrance (1925)

Arms

References

Kidd, Charles, Williamson, David (editors). Debrett's Peerage and Baronetage (1990 edition). New York: St Martin's Press, 1990.

External links 
 
 

1851 births
1927 deaths
People educated at Eton College
Alumni of Trinity College, Oxford
English King's Counsel
Barons in the Peerage of the United Kingdom
Bernard
Liberal Party (UK) MPs for English constituencies
UK MPs 1885–1886
UK MPs 1886–1892
UK MPs 1892–1895
UK MPs who inherited peerages
People from Honiton
Eldest sons of British hereditary barons
English barristers